Totalview may refer to:

 TotalView, a debugging tool by Rogue Wave Software, formerly TotalView Technologies, Inc.
 TotalView, a GPS-based management system by US Fleet Tracking
 Total View, a road-weather data management system by DTN

See also 
 Total Viewing Productions, an affiliate of the Cebu Catholic Television Network